Dennis Murphree Baker was an American lawyer and politician. He served two terms in the Mississippi House of Representatives and one term in the Mississippi State Senate. He also served as a judge in the 3rd district of the Mississippi Chancery Courts for over 25 years.

As of 1962, Baker was in his first term in the state senate, having previously completed his two terms in the state house.

On March 15, 1978, Baker was appointed as senior chancellor for the Third Chancery Court District of Mississippi.

References 

1927 births
2014 deaths
Members of the Mississippi House of Representatives
Mississippi state senators
20th-century American judges
21st-century American judges
Mississippi state court judges
20th-century American politicians
People from Panola County, Mississippi